Tracy Garner may refer to:

Tracy Garner, accessory in Murder of Anthony Walker
Tracy Garner, character in The Hangover